Raised by Wolves is an American science fiction drama television series created by Aaron Guzikowski that premiered on HBO Max on September 3, 2020. The first two episodes were directed by Ridley Scott, who also serves as an executive producer for the show. The series was renewed for a second season shortly after its debut, and the second season premiered on February 3, 2022.

The first season was met with generally positive reviews from critics, while the second season has received critical acclaim. In June 2022, the series was cancelled after two seasons.

The series was removed from HBO Max in December 2022. On January 31, 2023, it was announced that the series will be released on The Roku Channel and Tubi.

Premise
Raised by Wolves centers on two androids, Father and Mother, tasked with raising human children on Kepler-22b after the Earth was destroyed by a great war. As the burgeoning colony of humans threatens to be torn apart by religious differences, the androids learn that controlling the beliefs of humans is a treacherous and difficult task.

Cast and characters

Main

 Amanda Collin as Mother/Lamia, a powerful war android known as a 'Necromancer', reprogrammed to raise human children on virgin planet Kepler-22b to establish an atheist colony.
 Abubakar Salim as Father, a generic service model android reprogrammed to protect and support the colony's children.
 Winta McGrath as Campion, the youngest and only survivor of six children born from embryos brought to Kepler-22b by Mother and Father.
 Travis Fimmel as Marcus/Caleb, an atheist soldier and Mary's partner. Jack Hawkins portrays Caleb with his true face.
 Niamh Algar as Sue/Mary, an atheist soldier/medic and Caleb's partner. On Earth, she (Mary) and Caleb had killed a Mithraic couple, Sue and Marcus. Mary and Caleb altered their appearances to resemble the couple to get onto the Ark. Sienna Guillory portrays Mary with her true face.
 Jordan Loughran as Tempest, a surviving Ark child who despises the Mithraic due to having been raped by a religious leader.
 Felix Jamieson as Paul, the biological son of Marcus and Sue, raised by Caleb and Mary as their own child.
 Ethan Hazzard as Hunter, one of the surviving Ark young adults.
 Aasiya Shah as Holly, one of the surviving Ark children.
 Ivy Wong as Vita, one of the surviving Ark children.
 Matias Varela as Lucius, a loyal Mithraic soldier and survivor of the Ark crash.
 Peter Christoffersen as Cleaver (season 2)
 Selina Jones as Grandmother (season 2)
 Morgan Santo as Vrille (season 2)
 James Harkness as Tamerlane (season 2)
 Kim Engelbrecht as Decima (season 2)
 Jennifer Saayeng as Nerva (season 2)

Recurring
 Cosmo Jarvis as Campion Sturges, a former Mithraic scientist who changed his faith, fought for the atheist cause, and created Mother. One of the colony children is his namesake.
 Michael Pennington as the Trust (voice role), a quantum computer programmed by Campion Sturges to be administrator of the atheist collective on Kepler-22b.

Guest
 Steve Wall as Ambrose

Episodes

Series overview

Season 1 (2020)

Season 2 (2022)

Production

Development
On October 8, 2018, it was announced that TNT had given the production a series order. Executive producers were expected to include Ridley Scott, Aaron Guzikowski, David W. Zucker, Jordan Sheehan, Adam Kolbrenner, and Robyn Meisinger. Scott was also set to direct the first two episodes from Guzikowski's screenplays. Production companies included Scott Free Productions, Studio T, and Madhouse Entertainment.

On September 17, 2020, HBO Max renewed the series for a second season, which would also be produced in South Africa.

On June 3, 2022, Father actor Abubakar Salim confirmed that the series had been cancelled after two seasons, citing the merger of WarnerMedia and Discovery, Inc. into Warner Bros. Discovery as the reason for the cancellation. He additionally announced that Scott Free Productions would be pushing to find the show a new home and asked fans to rally around the cause. Actors Niamh Algar and Winta McGrath also asked for fan support, leading to the development of an ongoing social media campaign dubbed "Save Raised By Wolves." Salim has stated that the campaign has "Inspired the creatives to look for new ways of potentially telling and finishing this story. We will get answers... Just not in the same way we hoped."

Filming
The series was filmed in the Western Cape, specifically Somerset West, Stellenbosch and Cape Town, South Africa. On March 8, 2021, Salim announced that filming for the second season was in progress. Jennifer Saayeng, who plays Nerva in the second season, announced on Instagram that the filming for second season wrapped on August 15, 2021.

Casting
In January 2019, it was announced that Travis Fimmel, Amanda Collin, Abubakar Salim, Winta McGrath, Niamh Algar, Felix Jamieson, Ethan Hazzard, Jordan Loughran, Aasiya Shah, and Ivy Wong had been cast in starring roles. In March 2019, Matias Varela was cast in a starring role. On May 20, 2021, Peter Christoffersen, Selina Jones, Morgan Santo, James Harkness, Kim Engelbrecht, and Jennifer Saayeng joined the cast in starring roles for the second season.

Release

Broadcast and streaming
On October 29, 2019, it was announced the series would be moving to WarnerMedia's HBO Max streaming service. The series premiered on September 3, 2020.

In Canada, the series premiered on September 3, 2020, on CraveTV and CTV Sci-Fi Channel, and in French on January 14, 2021, on Super Écran. In Australia, the series premiered on September 3, 2020, on Fox Showcase. In the UK, the first three episodes were shown on Sky Atlantic on December 5, 2020. In France, the series premiered on December 7, 2020, on Warner TV. In Italy, it started on February 8, 2021, on Sky Atlantic.

Podcast 
On August 26, 2020, an official companion podcast produced by iHeartRadio was announced with the first episode premiering on September 3, 2020, in tandem with the launch of the series. The podcast features Aaron Guzikowski and invites "innovators from science and technology to discuss the most fascinating questions raised by the series."

Reception
For the first season, review aggregator Rotten Tomatoes reported an approval rating of 74% based on 58 critics, with an average rating of 7.1/10. The website's critics consensus reads, "Bristling with imagination and otherworldly imagery, Raised by Wolves is a bloody exploration of artificial intelligence and religious belief that will stimulate the eye and mind—if not the heart." Metacritic gave the series a weighted average score of 64 out of 100 based on 19 reviews, indicating "generally favorable reviews". Darren Franich of Entertainment Weekly gave the series a B- and wrote a review saying, "I've seen six episodes, and worry that the momentum drags. This is the kind of show where two sides fight, and then spend half a season preparing to fight again. The eccentric performances are intriguing, though." John Anderson of The Wall Street Journal said, "The storyline is involved, but keeps a viewer off-balance in a good way. It looks great. And Mother... is the most memorable female/female-like space entity since Sigourney Weaver's Ripley in Alien." Writing for RogerEbert.com, Nick Allen gave the series a mixed review, lamenting that, "intellectual exploration of this story ... is incredibly cold" and comparing it to Scott's 2012 film Prometheus.

For the second season, Rotten Tomatoes reported a 86% approval rating with an average rating of 7.9/10, based on 14 critic reviews. The website's critics consensus states, "Raised by Wolves sophomore season doubles down on everything that made it so beguiling—and sometimes off-putting—in the first place, and the gamble pays off with a science fiction vision that feels wholly its own." Metacritic assigned a score of 84 out of 100 based on 6 critics, indicating "universal acclaim".

References

External links
 Raised by Wolves on Fox Showcase
 
 Raised By Wolves: The Podcast on Apple Podcasts

2020 American television series debuts
2022 American television series endings
2020s American drama television series
2020s American science fiction television series
Androids in television
Dystopian television series
English-language television shows
HBO Max original programming
Post-apocalyptic television series
Television series by Scott Free Productions
Television series set in outer space
Television shows filmed in South Africa